Vaino or Väino is both a masculine Estonian given name and a surname. Notable people with the name include:

Given name
Väino Aren (born 1933), Estonian ballet dancer, actor and operetta singer
Väino Ilus (born 1929), Estonian writer
Väino Laes (born 1951), Estonian actor
Väino Linde (born 1959), Estonian lawyer and politician
Väino Reinart (born 1962), Estonian diplomat
Vaino Spencer (1920–2016), American judge
Vaino Vahing (1940–2008), Estonian writer, prosaist, psychiatrist and playwright
Vaino Väljas (born 1931), Estonian Soviet politician, Chairman of the 6th Supreme Soviet of the Estonian SSR
Vaino Olavi Partanen (1928–1969), Canadian naval chief petty officer
Väino Puura (born 1951), Estonian opera and operetta singer 
Väino Uibo (born 1942), Estonian actor and theatre director
Väinö Voionmaa (1869–1947), Finnish politician and academic

Surname
Anton Vaino (born 1972), Russian diplomat and politician
Ants Vaino (1940–1971), Estonian racing driver
Arnold Vaino (1900–1960), Estonian actor
Joonas Vaino (born 1992), Estonian basketball player
Karl Vaino (1923–2022), Soviet Estonian politician

Estonian-language surnames
Estonian masculine given names